The National Film Archive may refer to:

BFI National Archive, which was called the National Film Archive between 1955 and 1992
National Film Archive of India, a division of the Indian Ministry of Information and Broadcasting
National Film Archive of Japan, an independent administrative institution and museum
Taiwan Film and Audiovisual Institute, known as the National Film Archive from 1989–1995